Garlic soup is a type of soup using garlic as a main ingredient. In Spanish cuisine,  sopa de ajo ('soup of garlic') is a traditional garlic soup made with bread and egg poached in chicken broth, and laced with garlic and sherry.

By country

Czech Republic 
In the Czech Republic, garlic soup is called česnečka. It is made with garlic and potatoes and topped with fried bread. Sometimes cheese, ham or eggs are added.

France
Versions of garlic soup have been prepared in Provence, France.

Mexico
Versions of garlic soup similar to Spanish versions are prepared in Mexico.

Poland
In Poland, garlic soup is sometimes called zupa na gwoździu (literally soup on the nail). 

In Upper Silesia, the traditional wodzionka soup has a garlic-based version, made with diced garlic, hard-boiled egg, potatoes and fried bread.

Slovakia
Česnečka is also a part of Slovak cuisine.

Spain
In Spain, egg whites are sometimes whipped into the soup, as with egg drop soup. Sopa de ajo is a traditional winter soup in Palencia where it is made with bread mixed with pepper, water and garlic. It is cooked slowly and a raw egg is often whipped into the soup as it is served. Sopa de ajo is also traditional in Castilian-Leonese cuisine and Castilian-Manchego cuisine. In Extremaduran cuisine, sopa blanca de ajos (white bean garlic soup) is a tradition.

See also

 Garlic bread
 List of garlic dishes
 List of soups

References

Further reading

 

Spanish soups and stews
Czech cuisine
Garlic dishes